Josep Rius-Camps (born June 15, 1933, in Esparreguera, Barcelona, Spain) is a priest, biblical scholar and patristic scholar. Professor emeritus of the Faculty of Theology of Catalonia.

D. in Oriental ecclesiastical sciences from the Pontifical Oriental Institute in Rome (1968), where he also taught at the University of Münster and the Augustinianum in Rome. He is the author of numerous studies -in Catalan, Spanish and English- on patristics (Origen, the Pseudoclementines and Ignatius of Antioch) and on the New Testament (Mark and Luke-Acts). He was director of the Catalan Journal of Theology from its foundation in 1976 until 2008. He has been editor, with Jenny Read-Heimerdinger, of the bilingual edition (Greek-Spanish), for the first time in a single work, of the two volumes of Luke's writings: Demonstration to Theophilus. Gospel and Acts of the Apostles according to the Beza Codex (Fragmenta Editorial, 2009), winner of the City of Barcelona Prize for translation into Catalan for its previous edition in this language, in 2009. In 2012 it was translated into English. In his novel Diari de Teòfil (Fragmenta Editorial, 2011) he gave narrative form to research on the work of Luke. Conversations with Josep Rius-Camps, by Ignasi Moreta, have recently been published. He lives in the hermitage of Sant Pere de Reixac.

Works 

 RIUS CAMPS, Josep, The Message of Acts in Codex Bezae. London: T & T Clark International, 2004,  ISBN 9780567114143
 RIUS CAMPS, Josep, The Message of Acts in Codex Bezae (vol 2). London: T & T Clark International, 2006, ISBN 9780567040121
 RIUS CAMPS, Josep, The Message of Acts in Codex Bezae (vol 3). London: T & T Clark International, 2007, ISBN 9780567032485
 RIUS CAMPS, Josep, The Message of Acts in Codex Bezae (vol 4). London: T & T Clark International, 2009, ISBN 9780567048998
 RIUS CAMPS, Josep, Diari de Teòfil (Barcelona: Fragmenta Editorial, 2011) ISBN 978-84-92416-49-3
 RIUS-CAMPS, Josep, Camino de Pablo a la misión de los paganos: Hch 13-28, El (Madrid: Ediciones Cristiandad), ISBN 978-84-7057-346-0
 RIUS CAMPS, Josep, with Jenny Read-Heimerdinger (editors)  Demostración a Teófilo. Evangelio y Hechos de los Apóstoles según el Códice Beza (Barcelona: Fragmenta Editorial, 2012. ISBN 978-84-92416-52-3 (In Catalan ISBN 978-84-92416-17-2; in English ISBN 9780567438881)

References 

Spanish priests
Spanish biblical scholars
1933 births
Living people